George Spruce (3 April 1923 –  14 October 1998) was an English professional footballer who played as a defender in The Football League for three clubs.

Playing career

Spruce was born in Chester and was invited for trials with Bolton Wanderers in August 1939 while playing local football in Chester, but the outbreak of war ended his hopes of joining the club. He finally got his chance in professional football in October 1948 when he joined Wrexham from Chester-based side Heath Rangers and played regularly before moving to Football League Second Division side Barnsley in May 1952. His spell at Wrexham overlapped with his younger brother Phil's time at the club, for whom he played from 1950 to 1956.

Although Barnsley were relegated in George's first season at the club, he was a regular part of the side when they topped Division Three North in 1954–55. He remained at Oakwell for two years before joining hometown club Chester in July 1958. At 35 he was one of Chester's oldest debutants when he played for the club for the first time against York City three months later. Spruce scored an own goal in the final minute in a 2–2 draw but went on to make 63 appearances for the club over the next three years.

Chester was to be Spruce's last league club and he played for Runcorn and Prestatyn before hanging up his boots. He was employed by the gas board and then worked as a taxicab driver.

Honours

Wrexham

 Welsh Cup runners-up: 1949–50.

Barnsley

 Football League Division Three North champions: 1954–55 (44 apps, 0 goals).

External links
 'What Happened To…' feature on Spruce and some of his Chester team-mates

References

1923 births
Sportspeople from Chester
1998 deaths
English footballers
English Football League players
Association football defenders
Wrexham A.F.C. players
Barnsley F.C. players
Chester City F.C. players
Runcorn F.C. Halton players
Prestatyn Town F.C. players